Mahmudul Hasan Joy (born 13 November 2000) is a Bangladeshi cricketer. He made his List A debut for Bangladesh Krira Shikkha Protishtan in the 2018–19 Dhaka Premier Division Cricket League on 8 March 2019.

Early life
Mahmudul Hasan Joy was born on 13 November 2000 in the West Larua village of Faridganj sub-district in the Chandpur district. He is the third of four children of Abdul Barek and Hasina Begum. Joy started his journey with cricket from Clemon Chandpur cricket academy. In 2014, he got admitted in Bangladesh Krira Shikkha Protishtan.

Youth and domestic career
In December 2019, he was named in Bangladesh's squad for the 2020 Under-19 Cricket World Cup. In the second Super League semi-final of the tournament, against New Zealand, he scored a century in Bangladesh's six-wicket win.

He made his Twenty20 debut on 6 December 2020, for Gazi Group Chattogram in the 2020–21 Bangabandhu T20 Cup. In February 2021, he was selected in the Bangladesh Emerging squad for their home series against the Ireland Wolves. He made his first-class debut on 26 February 2021, for the Bangladesh Emerging team against Ireland Wolves.

International career
In November 2021, he was named in Bangladesh's Test squad for their series against Pakistan. He made his Test debut on 4 December 2021, for Bangladesh against Pakistan. In January 2022, he scored his first Test fifty against New Zealand at Bay Oval on the first match of the  series. However, he missed reminder of the series due to a finger injury, which he picked on the fourth day of first Test match.

In February 2022, he was named in Bangladesh's One Day International (ODI) squad for their series against Afghanistan. In March 2022, he was named in Bangladesh's ODI squad for their series against South Africa.

In April 2022, in the first match against South Africa, Joy scored his first century in Test cricket. He also became the first batter for Bangladesh to score a century against South Africa in Tests.

References

External links
 

2000 births
Living people
Bangladeshi cricketers
Bangladesh Test cricketers
Bangladesh Krira Shikkha Protishtan cricketers
People from Chandpur District